Honor is a primarily feminine given name derived from the word "honour", taken from a Latin root word honos, honoris. It was a virtue name in use by the Puritans. It is still in occasional use in England, but is an extremely rare name in the United States, where it has never ranked among the top 1,000 names for girls or boys.

Variants
Annora (Irish)
Hanora (Irish)
Honora (English), (Irish)
Onorata (Italian)
Honorata (Polish)
Honoré (boy) (French)
Honorée (girl) (French)
Honorina (Filipino)
Honorine (French)
Honour (English)
Nora (English), (Irish)
Onóra (Irish)
Onur (Turkish)
Onur (Azerbaijani)

People named Honor
Honor Grenville (1493–1495 – 1566) a Cornish Lady whose domestic life from 1533 to 1540 during the reign of King Henry VIII is exceptionally well-recorded, due to the survival of the Lisle Papers in the National Archives, the state archives of the UK.
Honor Blackman (1925–2020), English actress
Honor Carter (born 1982), field hockey player from New Zealand
Honor Crowley (1903–1966), Irish politician
Honor Fell (1900–1986), English biologist and zoologist
Honor Flaherty (died 1848), Irish Famine victim
Honor Ford-Smith (born 1951), Jamaican actress, playwright, scholar, and poet
Honor Fraser (born 1974), Scottish art dealer and former model
Honor Harger (born 1975), curator and artist from New Zealand
Honor Jackson (born 1948), American football player
Honor Kneafsey (born 2004), British actress
Honor McKellar (born 1920), former New Zealand mezzo-soprano opera singer and singing teacher
Honor Moore, American writer of poetry, creative nonfiction and plays
Honor Smith (1908 – 1995), English neurologist
Honor Swinton Byrne (born 1997), Scottish actress
Honor Titus (born 1989), American multi-disciplinary artist and musician
Honor Tracy (1913–1989), English writer
Honor Marie Warren (born 2008), daughter of Jessica Alba
Honor Wyatt (1910 – 1998), English journalist and radio presenter

People named Honour
 Honour Gombami (born 1983), Zimbabwean football player

Fictional characters
Honor Harrington, a fictional character from the Honor Harrington book series
Honor Huntzberger, a fictional character from the television series Gilmore Girls.
Honor Klein, a fictional character from the novel A Severed Head by Iris Murdoch

Notes

English feminine given names
Virtue names